Buford is an unincorporated community and census-designated place in central Clay Township, Highland County, Ohio, United States. The population was 352 at the 2010 census. it once had a post office, with the ZIP code 45110. The current ZIP code 45171 is for nearby Sardinia.

History
Buford was platted in 1834, and named after the maiden name of the wife of a first settler.

Geography
Buford lies in southwestern Highland County at the intersection of State Routes 134, 138, and 321. Route 134 leads north  to Lynchburg and south  to Sardinia. Route 138 leads northeast  to Hillsboro, the Highland county seat, while Route 321 leads southeast  to Mowrystown.

Demographics

Notable people
Edmund Wittenmyer, U.S. Army major general

Gallery

References

Census-designated places in Ohio
Census-designated places in Highland County, Ohio